"Stop This Flame" is a song by British singer and songwriter Celeste. The single was released on 9 January 2020 through Both Sides and Polydor Records as the second single from her debut studio album Not Your Muse. It was written by Celeste and Jamie Hartman, who produced the track with John Hill. The song samples Nina Simone's version of "Sinnerman" and Nina Simone is credited as a co-author.

The song was released following Celeste's win of BBC's annual music poll Sound of 2020. It became her first-ever solo single, and second single overall (since "Sing That Song" with Tieks), to chart in her home country, spending 8 weeks on the UK Singles Chart. From September 2020, it became the theme song for Sky Sports' weekend coverage (Saturday Night Football and Super Sunday) of the Premier League for the 2020-21 season. The song is also featured on the soundtrack of FIFA 21. The song also appears in the 2021 Peloton and Royal Mail TV adverts.

Background and composition 
"Stop This Flame" was Celeste's first single of 2020, the year in which she was critically tipped for success by many major publications. Celeste told Dork, "In essence, 'Stop This Flame' is a song about seeing it through to the end. Whether it’s about not letting go of love, not letting go of a dream or stridently coming through some form of adversity. The song has always evoked those feelings within me.” She told Apple Music, "For me when I sing the song, it's about like never ending determination to get that point." The song is "driven by an insistent minor-key piano vamp."

Music video 
The song's music video was directed by Leonn Ward and shot in New Orleans. It premiered on YouTube on 7 February 2020, and was later nominated for Best British R&B/Soul Video at the 2020 UK Music Video Awards.

Critical reception 
The single was described by Robin Murray of Clash as "a piano-driven stomper that carries a level of euphoria that rivals club culture", whilst comparing it to "You've Got the Love" by Florence and The Machine. Peter Helman from Stereogum described as "a catchy and vaguely jazz-indebted uptempo R&B song". The song was described by The Times as "up-tempo, piano-driven Amy Winehouse".

Credits and personnel 
Credits adapted from Tidal:

 Celeste Epiphany Waite: vocals, composer, lyricist
 Jamie Hartman: producer, composer, lyricist, bass programming, guitar, Mellotron, organ, percussion, piano, recording engineer, strings, synthesizer
 John Hill: producer, bass, drums, guitar, programming
 Nina Simone: composer, lyricist
 Jeremie Inhaber: assistant remix engineer
 Robin Florent: assistant remix engineer
 Scott Desmaris: assistant remix engineer
 Blake Mares: engineer
 Rob Cohen: engineer
 John Davis: mastering engineer
 Chris Galland: mixing engineer
 Manny Marroquin: mixing engineer
 Rafa Padilla: percussion
 Davide Rossi: strings
 Stuart Crichton: synthesizer programming

Charts

Weekly charts

Year-end charts

Certifications

References 

Celeste (singer) songs
2020 singles
Polydor Records singles
Songs written by Jamie Hartman